The 2002 Chevrolet Monte Carlo 400 with The Looney Tunes was the 26th stock car race of the 2002 NASCAR Winston Cup Series and the 45th iteration of the event. The race was held on Saturday, September 7, 2002, in Richmond, Virginia, at Richmond International Raceway, a 0.75 miles (1.21 km) D-shaped oval. The race took the scheduled 400 laps to complete. At race's end, Matt Kenseth, driving for Roush Racing, would come back from a two-lap deficit to win his fifth career NASCAR Winston Cup Series win and his fourth of the season. To fill out the podium, Ryan Newman of Penske Racing and Jeff Green of Richard Childress Racing would finish second and third, respectively.

Background 

Richmond International Raceway (RIR) is a 3/4-mile (1.2 km), D-shaped, asphalt race track located just outside Richmond, Virginia in Henrico County. It hosts the Monster Energy NASCAR Cup Series and Xfinity Series. Known as "America's premier short track", it formerly hosted a NASCAR Camping World Truck Series race, an IndyCar Series race, and two USAC sprint car races.

Entry list 

 (R) denotes rookie driver.

Practice

First practice 
The first practice session was held on Friday, September 6, at 11:20 AM EST, and lasted for 2 hours.

Second practice 
The second practice session was held on Friday, September 6, at 4:45 PM EST, and lasted for 45 minutes.

Third and final practice 
The third and final practice session, sometimes referred to as Happy Hour, was held on Friday, September 6, at 6:15 PM EST, and lasted for 45 minutes.

During the session, Jeff Gordon would careen his car into the outside wall in Turn 2, causing substantial damage to his car and forcing Gordon to use a backup. The special Bugs Bunny scheme that was planned to run was instead replaced by Gordon's regular "Flames" scheme, with Gordon saying "We're going to go with the flames. [My firesuit] is about all that is left of Bugs for the day."

Qualifying 
Qualifying was held on Friday, September 6, at 3:05 PM EST. Each driver would have two laps to set a fastest time; the fastest of the two would count as their official qualifying lap. Positions 1-36 would be decided on time, while positions 37-43 would be based on provisionals. Six spots are awarded by the use of provisionals based on owner's points. The seventh is awarded to a past champion who has not otherwise qualified for the race. If no past champion needs the provisional, the next team in the owner points will be awarded a provisional.

Carl Long was the only driver to fail to qualify.

Full qualifying results

Race results

References 

2002 NASCAR Winston Cup Series
NASCAR races at Richmond Raceway
September 2002 sports events in the United States
2002 in sports in Virginia